Zara Home is a company that belongs to the Spanish Inditex group dedicated to the manufacturing of home textiles. It was created in 2003. It has around 408 stores in 44 countries. The company focuses on retailing various housewares.

The headquarters of Zara Home is located in A Coruña, Spain.

Stores
The number of Zara Home stores in each country as of 23 December 2019:

References 

Inditex brands
Retail companies established in 2003